John H. Hubbard (February 6, 1886 – April 2, 1978) was an American football player and coach.  He played college football as a halfback at Amherst College from 1903 to 1906.  Hubbard served as the head football coach at Amherst from 1907 to 1909 and at Massachusetts Agricultural College—now the University of Massachusetts Amherst—in 1911.  He was elected to the College Football Hall of Fame as a player in 1966.  Hubbard died on April 2, 1978, at the Adams House Health Care Center in Torrington, Connecticut.

Head coaching record

References

External links
 

1886 births
1978 deaths
American football halfbacks
Amherst Mammoths football coaches
Amherst Mammoths football players
UMass Minutemen football coaches
All-American college football players
College Football Hall of Fame inductees
People from Hatfield, Massachusetts
Coaches of American football from Massachusetts
Players of American football from Massachusetts